Thornfield (foaled 1994 in Ontario) is a Canadian Thoroughbred Champion racehorse.

Background
Thornfield was bred by Steve Stavro's Knob Hill Farm, he was sired by Eclipse and Sovereign Award and Canadian Horse Racing Hall of Fame inductee Sky Classic, a son of the English Triple Crown winner, Nijinsky. Thornfield's dam was Alexandrina, a daughter of 1982 American Horse of the Year, Conquistador Cielo.

Racing career
In 1999, under trainer Phil England, five-year-old Thornfield won the Grade 2 Niagara Breeders' Cup Handicap. Ridden by Richard Dos Ramos, they then won the $1.5 million Canadian International as the longest shot in the field. The win made Thornfield the first winner sired by an International winner. His 1999 performances earned him Canadian Horse of the Year and Canadian Champion Male Turf Horse honours.

Retirement
Retired from racing, the gelding Thornfield now resides at the branch of Old Friends Equine at Kentucky Downs in Franklin, Kentucky.

Pedigree

References

 Thornfield's pedigree and partial racing stats
 Video at YouTube of Thornfield winning the Canadian International

1994 racehorse births
Racehorses bred in Canada
Racehorses trained in Canada
Sovereign Award winners
Canadian Thoroughbred Horse of the Year
Thoroughbred family 9-g